Zero Emissions Research and Initiatives (ZERI) is a research initiative that was founded by Gunter Pauli in 1994 at the  United Nations University(UNU) with support from the Japanese Government. The initiative was established three years before the Kyoto Protocol was agreed upon in 1997, with the aim of designing a new business model that could operate without generating emissions or waste.

Pauli led a team of scientists who were inspired by the workings of natural ecosystems to develop the proposal for a system that cascades nutrients, materials, and energy to ensure that all resources are used in the production and consumption process. The approach proposed by ZERI is based on the idea of creating closed-loop systems that minimize waste and maximize the efficient use of resources.

The principle of ZERI is that the only species capable of making something no one desires, is the human species.
In 1996, the United Nations Development Programme (UNDP) and Gunter Pauli decided to create the ZERI Foundation with the goal to translate the designs into pioneering experiences.  Originally, ZERI was headquartered at UNDP in Geneva, and later at IUCN in Gland. However, by 2008 the members decided to convert the central organization into a decentralized, time and place specific structures. By 2014, there are 34 project offices around the world. 

Emphasizing the vast potential of such innovations, Gunter Pauli initiated The Blue Economy concept in 2009. The book was accepted on November 2, 2009 as a Report to the Club of Rome.

Current situation

ZERI brings together creative minds which are looking for solutions to the principal challenges of the world. Always based on science and publicly available information, the common vision shared by each and every member of the ZERI network is to find and improve sustainable solutions for the society, from unreached communities to corporations inspired by what is locally available.

At the 20th anniversary of the creation of ZERI on November 12, 2014 at the UNU in Tokyo, it was reported that 34 organizations from around the world associated and inspired by this initiative of Gunter Pauli, have implemented 188 projects, mobilized €4 billion in capital and generated approximately 3 million jobs. 

Sustainable solutions are based on local culture and expertise.
 

For ZERI, the real investment lies in the creation of a present and future generation which is assured of sustainable livelihoods, capable of responding to the basic needs of all living species on Earth. This is why besides research and project implementation, ZERI is dedicated to education.

ZERI offices around the world

The Americas
Bonaire, Brazil, Chile, Colombia (Bogota and Manizales), Costa Rica, Ecuador, Mexico
Europe
Belgium (Brussels), Croatia (Zagreb), France (Paris), Germany (Stuttgart), Italy (Torino), Netherlands, Spain (Madrid, Balear Islands, Canary Islands), Romania (Bucarest), Sweden (Stockholm), Ukraine (Kyiv)
Africa
Algeria, Ghana, Kenya, Namibia, South Africa, Zimbabwe
Austral-Asia
Bhutan, China (Beijing, Shanghai), Fiji, India, Indonesia, Japan (Kamakura, Osaka, Tokyo)

ZERI International board

The Rt Hon Anders Wijkman (Sweden)
Co-President of the Club of Rome
Member of the Swedish Royal Academy of Sciences
Former Member of the European Parliament and President of Globe Europe (2000–2009)
Prof. Dr. Ashok Khosla (India)
Chairman of Development Alternatives Group
Former Chairman of IUCN
Prof. Dr. Heitor Gurgulino de Souza (Brazil)
President of the World Academy of Arts and Sciences
Former Rector of the UNU (1988–1997)
Prof. Dr. Jorge Reynolds Pombo (Colombia)
Scientist and Inventor
Prof. Yasuhiro Sakakibara (Japan)
Entrepreneur and Philanthropist

References 
 http://www.ecoestrategia.com/articulos/hemeroteca/zeri.pdf
 http://www.greenerdesign.com/news/2009/04/20/zeri-foundation-awarded-turning-coffee-waste-mushrooms
 https://web.archive.org/web/20090826144146/http://www.unam.na:80/centres/zeri/genesis.html
 http://www.scizerinm.org
 http://www.educarchile.cl/Portal.Base/Web/VerContenido.aspx?GUID=329e43fd-707d-4eeb-b2ba-60b44569072b&ID=182736
 http://www.marioninstitute.org/zeri
 https://web.archive.org/web/20132218094400/http://www.clubofrome.org/?p=1794

External links
Zero Emissions Research and Initiatives
ZERI projects translated into fables for children
The ZERI Philosophy in Action
A cartoon presenting ZERI in action

Conservation and environmental foundations